The Ipsut Creek Patrol Cabin was built by the United States National Park Service in 1933 in Mount Rainier National Park to house backcountry rangers. The log cabin resembles other cabins at Huckleberry Creek, Lake James and Three Lakes, all built to standard plans from the Park Service Branch of Plans and Designs, supervised by Acting Chief Architect W.G. Carnes.

The cabin was added to the National Register of Historic Places on March 13, 1991. It is part of the Mount Rainier National Historic Landmark District, which encompasses the entire park and which recognizes the park's inventory of Park Service-designed rustic architecture.

References

Government buildings completed in 1933
Park buildings and structures on the National Register of Historic Places in Washington (state)
Buildings and structures in Pierce County, Washington
Ranger stations in Mount Rainier National Park
Log cabins in the United States
National Register of Historic Places in Mount Rainier National Park
Log buildings and structures on the National Register of Historic Places in Washington (state)
1933 establishments in Washington (state)